King and Queen Court House is a census-designated place (CDP) in, and the county seat of King and Queen County, Virginia, United States. The population as of the 2010 census was 85. The community runs along State Route 14, on the north side of the valley of the Mattaponi River. King and Queen Court House is the location of Central High School, a post office, several businesses, and a government complex that includes the county's old and new court houses.

History 
The courthouse dates from circa 1750. Federal troops burned the building on March 10, 1864, during the American Civil War, but it was repaired and is still in service. On June 20, 1863, scouts of Confederate Brigadier General Montgomery Dent Corse reported a raiding party, 300 strong, burning and destroying the community.

King and Queen Courthouse Tavern Museum 
Renovation of the historic Fary Tavern began in December 1999, and the King and Queen Courthouse Tavern Museum officially opened to the public in May 2001. The museum's mission is to be an archive, museum and cultural center for King and Queen County history. The King and Queen Historical Society operates the Courthouse Tavern Museum in cooperative partnership with King and Queen County.

References

See also 
 King and Queen Courthouse Green Historic District

Census-designated places in King and Queen County, Virginia
County seats in Virginia
Census-designated places in Virginia